On 26 January 2012, the city of Andéramboukane attacked by MNLA rebels. In its statement, the MNLA says that after three hours of fighting, its fighters have captured the majority of Malian soldiers, and the city, including a lieutenant and a chief warrant officer. They further claimed to have seized three armored vehicles and ammunition.

References

2012 in Mali
Menaka
History of Azawad

Andéramboukane
January 2012 events in Africa
Andéramboukane